Events in 2008 in Japanese television.

Debuts

Ongoing shows
Music Fair, music (1964–present)
Mito Kōmon, jidaigeki (1969-2011)
Sazae-san, anime (1969–present)
FNS Music Festival, music (1974–present)
Panel Quiz Attack 25, game show (1975–present)
Soreike! Anpanman. anime (1988–present)
Downtown no Gaki no Tsukai ya Arahende!!, game show (1989–present)
Crayon Shin-chan, anime (1992–present)
Nintama Rantarō, anime (1993–present)
Chibi Maruko-chan, anime (1995–present)
Detective Conan, anime (1996–present)
SASUKE, sports (1997–present)
Ojarumaru, anime (1998–present)
One Piece, anime (1999–present)
Sgt. Frog, anime (2004-2011)
Bleach, anime (2004-2012)
Doraemon, anime (2005–present)
Gintama, anime (2006-2010)
Pocket Monsters Diamond & Pearl, anime (2006-2010)
Naruto Shippuden, anime (2007–2017)

Endings

See also
2008 in anime
2008 Japanese television dramas
2008 in Japan
2008 in Japanese music
List of Japanese films of 2008

References

 
2008 in Japan